The Ropers is an American sitcom television series that aired on ABC from March 13, 1979, to May 22, 1980. It is a spin-off of Three's Company and loosely based on the British sitcom George and Mildred, which was itself a spin-off of Man About the House, on which Three's Company was based.

It was taped at CBS Television City in the Fairfax District of Los Angeles, where its parent series, Three's Company, was taping at the time, from February to April 1979 (Season 1) and from July 1979 to February 1980 (Season 2).

Plot
The series focused on middle-aged couple Stanley (Norman Fell) and Helen Roper (Audra Lindley), who were landlords to Jack, Janet and Chrissy on Three's Company.

In this spin-off, the Ropers have sold their apartment building in the Three's Company episode "An Anniversary Surprise" (season 3, episode 20) to live in the upmarket community of Cheviot Hills, where the social-climbing Helen struggled to fit in with her neighbors. Stanley made little attempt to fit in with the standards of the community, thereby causing Helen much embarrassment.

As was the case during their time on Three's Company, opening credits for The Ropers alternate between Audra Lindley and Norman Fell being credited first.

Characters

Main characters
 Stanley Roper (Norman Fell) —A lower-middle-class, frugal, and often embarrassing retiree, who moved to Cheviot Hills after he is duped into buying a townhouse
 Helen Roper (Audra Lindley) —A sexually frustrated, social-climbing middle-aged woman who tries to fit into the community despite her husband Stanley's constant boorishness. Despite her attempts to fit in, she often proves herself to be as bumbling as her husband.
 Jeffrey P. Brookes III (Jeffrey Tambor) —The snobbish realtor who is also the Ropers' next-door neighbor.
 Anne Brookes (Patricia McCormack) —Brookes' long-suffering, down-to-earth homemaker wife, who looks after the house and their young son David. She and Helen become friendly, despite their husbands' frequently adversarial relationship with one another.
 David Brookes (Evan Cohen) —Jeffrey and Anne Brookes' 7-year-old son who is always tempted to bother Mr. Roper, which his parents don't approve of.

Recurring characters
 Jenny Ballinger (Louise Vallance) (season 2)—A young woman who had been living in the Ropers' storeroom
 Ethel Ambrewster (Dena Dietrich) —Helen's snobby elder sister; gives Helen an air kiss every time she sees her.
 Hubert Ambrewster (Rod Colbin)—Ethel's husband and Helen's brother-in-law
 Debbie Hopper (Lois Areno) —The girl Stanley sees at the hot tub in the neighborhood
 Joey (Richard B. Shull) —Stanley's best friend and one of Helen's enemies
 Hilda (Lucy Lee Flippin/Darcy Pulliam) (season 2)—Helen's sister who has 5 children and 1 on the way with her husband, "Fertile" Freddy
 Mother (Lucille Benson) —The mother of Helen, Hilda, and Ethel.

Creation
After the enormous success of Three's Company in its short first season in 1977, ABC head Fred Silverman was anxious to capitalize on the show's success. In early 1977, Silverman approached Fell and Lindley with the subject of doing a spin-off from the show after its first full season wrapped in the spring of 1978. Both actors as well as the Three's Company producers backed off as the show had yet to prove itself for an entire season. With the show's continued success in its second season, however, the idea was brought up again in 1978, this time by Three's Company's own producers as well as new ABC head Tony Thomopolous (Silverman had gone to NBC). The idea intrigued Lindley, but Fell was extremely reluctant, as he was satisfied with his role on a show that was already a proven hit. Fell feared that a spin-off would be unsuccessful and thus put him out of a good role and a job. To alleviate his fears, Three's Company producers contractually promised Fell that they would give the new series a year to prove itself. If the show were to be canceled prior to that time, then he and Lindley would return to Three's Company. A reluctant Fell agreed to the new terms.

Like Three's Company, The Ropers was introduced as a late season replacement series in the spring of 1979 premiering the same night as Three's Company on ABC's successful Tuesday night lineup, airing at 10pm. In its first season, the ratings for the show were very high (the show finished at #8 for the 1978–79 season), and had the second-highest series premiere rating at the time. After the season premiere, Three's Company went on hiatus, but The Ropers still did well. ABC reran the episodes over the summer of 1979 (in August on Sundays) where they continued to achieve high ratings leading many to believe that the series would enjoy a long run.

Cancellation 
At the beginning of the 1979–80 season, ABC moved the show to Saturdays at 8pm, resulting in an audience drop that put it near the bottom of the ratings. Being placed on Saturday nights, rather than on the ABC Tuesday night lineup, caused an immediate fall into the bottom ten (#52 out of 61 shows for the week of September 17–23, its second week of the season) as the show was in direct competition with the NBC show CHiPs. The show later moved to 8:30pm on Saturdays by January 1980. The move upset Fell to the point that he actually went to ABC headquarters in New York to plead with the network to move the show to a better time slot. His effort was in vain, however, and the show continued to pull in low ratings. The drop in ratings and the fact that the show wasn't pulling in the key young demographic audience led to announcement of the show's cancellation by ABC in May 1980. The last three episodes aired Thursdays at 9:30pm after Barney Miller in May 1980. Audra Lindley stated in Chris Mann's 1997 book about Three's Company that she was surprised that The Ropers had been canceled after a late-season surge in the series ratings had allowed it to finish the 1979–80 season at number 25; the Nielsen ratings for that year, however, list the series Soap at number 25.

With the series canceled, Fell approached Three's Company producers about the Ropers returning to the show. However, during the time The Ropers was on the air, the landlord characters had been replaced on Three's Company by Ralph Furley (Don Knotts). The addition had worked well and Three's Company had retained its popularity. The idea of returning Fell and Lindley to their original Three's Company roles was undesirable to producers and ABC, mainly because they had one character playing the landlord role now as opposed to two, which would require more money to be paid out per episode; the cancellation of The Ropers came just as Suzanne Somers began to renegotiate her contract, which would lead to her very public contract dispute during the 1980–81 television season that led to her departure from the series. The cancellation of The Ropers came just one month after the one-year contractual deadline had passed. Fell would later state that he always believed the decision to pull the plug on the show had been made much earlier, but that the network deliberately postponed making the cancellation official until after the one-year mark specifically to be relieved of the obligation to allow Fell and Lindley to return to Three's Company. There was an attempt by producers to sell the show to Silverman over at NBC; Silverman, however, passed on it too.

Despite the hard feelings, in March 1981 both Fell and Lindley made one final guest appearance on Three's Company (in Season 5, Episode #18 "Night of The Ropers") nearly a year after the end of their own series before the characters were retired for good. For audiences, it was a chance to see all of the three landlord characters – played by Fell, Lindley, and Knotts – on the same stage.

Tambor appeared on Three's Company that same season playing a different character, a wealthy but unwelcome suitor of Chrissy's cousin Cindy (Season 5, Episode #13). Tambor also made other guest appearances on Three's Company, portraying different characters.

The show was ranked number two on Time magazine's "Top 10 Worst TV Spin-Offs".

In July 2002 TV Guide named The Ropers the 49th worst TV series of all time.

Proposed spin-off 
In 1986, distributor D. L. Taffner revealed its plans for a spin-off of The Ropers called Three Apartments. The spin-off would again star Fell and Lindley, this time as landlords of a three-unit apartment building. The show was offered as either a two-year, 44-episode package in syndication starting April 1987, or as a 52-episode package on NBC-owned station checkerboards beginning in September 1987. Guest stars would include John Ritter, Joyce DeWitt, Richard Kline and Don Knotts from Three's Company; Robert Mandan from Three's a Crowd; and Jim J. Bullock and Nancy Dussault from Too Close for Comfort/The Ted Knight Show. Three Apartments was to replace The Ted Knight Show, a fellow Taffner-distributed show that ended production after the death of show namesake Ted Knight in August 1986. The spin-off was withdrawn in January 1987 because of a glut of syndicated sitcom offerings, a lack of time slots, and a difficult advertising market.

Episodes

Season 1 (1979)

Season 2 (1979–80)

Syndication
The Ropers was aired in syndication on local channels in the 1980s and early 1990s, but has had limited airings in recent years, likely because, due to its relatively short network run—roughly a season-and-a-half—there aren't enough episodes to strip the show. Two episodes of the series, however, play in the syndication package of Three's Company. When initially offered in syndication, the series ran under the title Three's Company's Friends, The Ropers. That version used an instrumental version of the original series' theme song. Six episodes of the series were aired on TV Land in September 2006, and four episodes were aired on WGN America in October 2008.

Beginning in January 2011 Antenna TV, a television network designed for digital television subchannels and owned by Tribune Broadcasting, aired the sitcom. The series started on Tuesday, February 15, 2011, and went through one entire rotation of all episodes before being removed from the lineup. On August 29, 2011, the show returned to the lineup as the Three's Company cycle again came to the point of the series where the Ropers left.

Antenna TV usually shows back-to-back episodes of Three's Company. But when the cycle comes to the point of the Ropers' departure, the network then airs The Ropers following a single episode of Three's Company until the end of the Ropers cycle, then resumes the back-to-back Three's Company airings.

Beginning in 2015, Antenna TV began airing the series on weekends back to back with the other Three's Company spin-off series Three's a Crowd.

The Ropers can currently be seen on Pluto TV channel Classic TV Comedy and Tubi

References

External links
 Sitcoms Online: The Ropers
 

1970s American sitcoms
1979 American television series debuts
1980s American sitcoms
1980 American television series endings
American Broadcasting Company original programming
American television series based on British television series
American television spin-offs
English-language television shows
Fictional married couples
Television duos
Television series about couples
Television series about marriage
Television shows set in Los Angeles
Three's Company